Mattias Zachrisson (born 22 August 1990) is a Swedish handball player for Füchse Berlin and the Swedish national team.

He has competed at the 2012 Summer Olympics, where Sweden has got to the final.

References

External links

1990 births
Living people
Swedish male handball players
Handball players at the 2012 Summer Olympics
Handball players at the 2016 Summer Olympics
Olympic handball players of Sweden
Olympic silver medalists for Sweden
Olympic medalists in handball
Medalists at the 2012 Summer Olympics
Eskilstuna Guif players
Füchse Berlin Reinickendorf HBC players
Expatriate handball players
Handball-Bundesliga players
Swedish expatriate sportspeople in Germany
People from Huddinge Municipality
Sportspeople from Stockholm County